The 1963 San Francisco 49ers season was the franchise's 14th season in the National Football League and their 18th overall. The 49ers did not qualify for playoffs, having only two wins in the preseason and the actual season combined. Compared to seventeen losses total (both pre and actual season).

Offseason

NFL Draft

Preseason

Schedule

Regular season

Schedule

Notes
 In the September 29 game at Minnesota, John Brodie suffered a season-ending injury. After the game Red Hickey resigned as head coach.
 The following week at Detroit, Bob Waters makes his first career start at quarterback.
 On October 20 against Chicago, Lamar McHan takes over as starting quarterback for the Niners, and leads them to their first victory since December 2, 1962.

Standings

Roster

Awards, records, and honors
Tommy Davis: Pro Bowl selection
Abe Woodson: Pro Bowl selection

References

External links
 1963 49ers on Pro Football Reference
 49ers Schedule on jt-sw.com

San Francisco 49ers seasons
San Francisco 49ers
San Fran
San Fran 49